(BJW) is a Japanese professional wrestling promotion established in 1995. It is most famous for its deathmatch style contests.

History
Big Japan Pro Wrestling was founded in March 1995 by former AJPW wrestlers Shinya Kojika and Kendo Nagasaki, during the boom period for Deathmatch wrestling in Japan. Kendo Nagasaki left in 1999; Shinya Kojika is still president of the company to date.

The promotion followed in the footsteps of organizations such as Frontier Martial-Arts Wrestling (FMW), Wrestling International New Generations (W*ING), and the International Wrestling Association of Japan (IWA Japan), who helped popularise a hard-hitting, violent and bloody style of wrestling known as the Deathmatch, or in more recent years, "hardcore" wrestling. These matches are usually weapon filled, using both "conventional" weapons (such as chairs and tables), as well as "extreme" weapons not usually seen in mainstream wrestling, and previously unused in wrestling at all. These weapons include but are by no means limited to, nails, thumbtacks, fire, and fluorescent light tubes. Barbed wire is also often used liberally in these matches, sometimes wrapped around other weapons, laid on the floor surrounding the ring, wrapped around the ring ropes, or even replacing the ropes altogether. In its early years, BJW was unable to directly compete with the budgets of its competition. This led to the innovation of several unique gimmick matches, many of which helped hide its monetary shortcomings. These include:

Circus Deathmatch - above the ring is a scaffold and under that scaffold, there is a type of circus net made of barbed wire. When a wrestler falls off the scaffold the barbed wire spider net is there to "catch" the wrestlers. After a wrestler, or a team of wrestlers, has been thrown into the net it is cut down and the match continues to a pinfall.
Piranha Deathmatch - Barbed wire boards are placed in the corners. In the middle of the ring, there is a tank full of Piranhas. To win you must hold your opponent in the tank for ten seconds.
Scorpion Deathmatch- This match is similar to the Piranha Deathmatch, but with cacti replacing barbed wire boards and a tank full of scorpions rather than piranhas.
Crocodile Deathmatch - Two wrestlers compete in a non-specific death match. The loser of the match must then go on to wrestle a crocodile. This type of match has only been performed once, between Shadow WX & Mitsuhiro Matsunaga.
Fire Stone Deathmatch - Electrified space heaters wrapped in barbed wire surround the ring both outside and inside, and the match is won by pinfall.
Big Japan W*ING Crisis Big Born Deathmatch (also known as "Crisis Big Born Deathmatch") - A match that combines several different deathmatch types. The match begins on a scaffold above a barbed wire net over a ring. The ring itself is surrounded by cacti, fire stones (electric space heaters wrapped in barbed wire), and dry ice. Thumbtacks are scattered in the ring. In the middle of the ring is a tank of scorpions. Various weapons including light bulbs, light tubes, baseball bats, drills, buzzsaws, and swords are permitted. The match is fought with all members of two teams active at the same time under hardcore street fight rules. When all the wrestlers have fallen into the barbed wire net, the next phase of the match begins. The barbed wire net is removed and the match continues. Wrestlers leave and win the match by submission, by having their head put in the scorpion tank for ten seconds, or by passing out.
"Ancient Way" Death Match - Both fighters wrap their hands in hemp rope, which is then coated in honey and dipped in broken glass to make them deadly weapons.
Big Japan CZW Crisis Big Born Cage of Death Deathmatch - a steel cage match with various weapons, objects, and plenty of wrestling violence that combines several types of deathmatches; a steel cage with various weapons and objects will be contested under "BJW's Crisis Big Born Deathmatch" rules. Electrified cage walls, tables, ladders, chairs, crowbars, Singaporean canes, barbed-wire-board, thumbtacks, bed-of-nails, circus-style-scaffold into a barbed-wire-trampoline, tub of scorpions, cactus plants, light tubes, light bulbs, glass, fire stones, dry Ice, barbed-wire-bat, drills, swords, knives, guns, buzzsaws and all other weapons have been used in it.
Big Japan WWE Crisis Big Born Hell in a Cell Deathmatch- This is a 24-foot-high roofed cell structure that combines several types of deathmatches; a 24-foot-high roofed cell structure will be contested and competed under "BJW's Crisis Big Born Deathmatch" rules. The match starts on a scaffold above a barbed wire net over a ring. The ring and the cell structure themselves are surrounded by cacti, fire stones (electric space heaters wrapped in barbed wire), dry ice, and all other weapons. Thumbtacks and Japanese kenzans are scattered in the ring and the cell. In the middle of the ring and the cell are all tanks of scorpions and every other thing else. Various weapons and objects including light bulbs, bats, drills, saws, swords, guns, and every other thing else whatsoever are permitted. The match is fought with all other different formats and stipulations (singles, tag team, gauntlet, etc.) active at the same time under street fight rules. There are no disqualifications, no count-outs, and no knock-outs (also no escape). The only way to win is by pinfall or submission inside the ring.

Away from the Deathmatches, BJW also has had well-established normal wrestling titles. On February 3, 1998, Yoshihiro Tajiri won a one-night-only 8-man tournament in Tokyo to crown BJW's first World Junior Heavyweight Champion. This match showed a distinct departure from the violent matches BJW is known for. The company also has had a World Heavyweight Championship, a World Women's Championship, a World Tag Team Championship, and a World 4-Man Tag Team Shuffle Championship. Although the World Tag Team and Deathmatch, titles are the only ones still active.

Currently, the BJW roster is split into "Deathmatch BJ", "Strong BJ" and "Strong J". The deathmatch workers wrestle for the BJW Deathmatch Heavyweight Championship, the non-deathmatch heavyweight workers for the BJW World Strong Heavyweight Championship, and the junior heavyweight workers for the BJW Junior Heavyweight Championship.

Big Japan Pro Wrestling Core
Big Japan Pro Wrestling Core (BJW Core) is a video-on-demand service owned by Big Japan Pro Wrestling. In November 2017, BJW announced "Big Japan Pro Wrestling Core", a new worldwide video-on-demand site for the promotion's events. The service features matches from the promotion's archives, dating back to 1995. In December 2018, BJW announced that the service would shut down at the end of the year, with plans to relaunch in February 2019 using a new service provider. The service was then reactivated.

Working relationships
Big Japan has had interpromotional feuds with both New Japan Pro-Wrestling (NJPW) and Combat Zone Wrestling (CZW). These were both kayfabe feuds that were done to generate more income for both companies. During late 1996 and early 1997, BJW agreed with NJPW. Being a relatively new promotion, BJW needed mainstream publicity. NJPW agreed to a feud, which would allow Big Japan wrestlers to appear in their company and use New Japan's popularity to give exposure to their company. In return, Big Japan agreed to lose the feud and the majority of the interpromotional matches, therefore strengthening the New Japan brand. The situation provided an interesting clash of wrestling styles, as NJPW often favored a strong style of competition. The two promotions held Wrestling World 1997, the biggest event during the interpromotional feud and the fifth January 4 Tokyo Dome Show. In the late 1990s and into the 2000s, BJW competed against CZW. CZW was a relatively new American promotion at the time, and also largely focused on an extreme style of wrestling. Wrestlers feuded in both companies having matches in the United States and Japan. During the CZW feud, top star Tomoaki Honma departed the company to become a freelancer.

In 2008, BJW entered into a working relationship with Chikara. In October 2008, several BJW wrestlers went to America and faced Chikara in The Global Gauntlet. BJW did well, winning the best of five series on night one, but narrowly lost the Global Gauntlet match on the second night. In 2009, BJW hosted Chikara's inaugural Japanese tour.

In 2012, BJW established a three-way working relationship with CZW and German promotion Westside Xtreme Wrestling (wXw), which led to the creation of the World Triangle League tournament. The working relationship ended in 2016.

BJW has also had a long working relationship with the Union Pro Wrestling promotion, which has included BJW workers holding titles in Union Pro and vice versa. The relationship ended in 2014 when UPW shut down.

Roster

Deathmatch BJ

Strong BJ

Strong J

Freelancers

Staff

Notable alumni/guests

Male

Abdullah the Butcher
Akira Hyodo
Alejandro
Axl Rotten
Craig
Crazy Sheik
Daichi Kakimoto
Daigoro Kashiwa
Daikokubo Benkei
DJ Nira
Fuma
Gedo
Gentaro
Hayato Tamura
Homicide
HUB
The Iceman
Jado
James Keenan
Jason Ray Nope
Kamikaze
Jun Kasai
Kazuo Sakurada
Kintaro Kanemura
Koji Doi
Kuuga
Mad Man Pondo
Masada
Masato Inaba
Mike Samples
Mitsuhiro Matsunaga
Miyawaki
Necro Butcher
Nobuhiro Shimatani
Ryota Nakatsu
Sagat
Shadow WX
Shinya Ishikawa
Takashi Sasaki
Mr. Pogo
Takoyakida
Tank Nagai
Tarzan Goto
Tomoaki Honma
Tomomitsu Matsunaga
Towa Iwasaki
Violento Jack
Yoshihiro Tajiri
Yoshihisa Uto
Yusuke Kubo

Female

Akane Fujita
Aoi Kizuki
Ayame Sasamura
Azumi Hyuga
Command Bolshoi
Giulia
Mika Iwata
Misae Genki
Kiyoko Ichiki
Gami
Hanako Nakamori
Itsuki Aoki
Kazuki
Kyoko Kimura
Maika Ozaki
Mochi Miyagi
Sachie Abe
Sawako Shimono
Suzu Suzuki
Tequila Saya
Yuu Yamagata

CZW Warriors (2000–2002)
A derivation of this stable also appeared in Fire Pro Wrestling Returns as the Mad Gaijins, which consisted of Mad Man Pondo and 2 Tuff Tony.

Nick Mondo
John Zandig
Johnny Kashmere
Justice Pain
Nate Hatred
Nick Berk
Nick Gage
Ruckus
Trent Acid
Van Hammer
Wifebeater

Championships

Current
This is a list of championships promoted by the company. Some of them are not created by it.

GCW Ultraviolent Championship has Changed to Alex Colon after defeated Masashi Takeda at Nick Gage Invitational 6 Final

Defunct

Former

Tournaments

BJW also holds annual tournaments to decide the top wrestler or tag team in the promotion:

Broadcasters
Domestic:
Fighting TV Samurai
Nico Nico Douga 
Worldwide:
BJW Core

See also

Professional wrestling in Japan
List of professional wrestling promotions in Japan
Fire Pro Wrestling Returns

References

External links

 
Japanese professional wrestling promotions
1995 establishments in Japan
Entertainment companies established in 1995
Companies based in Yokohama